Martin-Little House is a historic home located in Charlestown Township, Chester County, Pennsylvania. It consists of five sections built between about 1735 and 1960.  The oldest section was built about 1735, and is a -story, stuccoed stone saltbox form dwelling.  A -story, five bay, stone main section was added as a wing in 1810. Later additions are the two-story kitchen wing dated to the late-19th century; two-story bedroom wing from the mid-20th century; and one-story, shed roofed frame addition of 1960.  The oldest section may have served as a stagecoach stop and post office in the mid-18th century.

It was added to the National Register of Historic Places in 1973.

References

Houses on the National Register of Historic Places in Pennsylvania
Houses completed in 1960
Houses in Chester County, Pennsylvania
National Register of Historic Places in Chester County, Pennsylvania